William M. "Bill" Brown is the former chairman of L3Harris Technologies, a large defense contracting company. Previously, he was the president, CEO and chairman of Harris Corporation, the company that merged with L3 Technologies to create L3Harris Technologies in 2019.

Education
Brown earned a bachelor's degree in 1984, and a master's  in 1987, both in mechanical engineering from Villanova University. He received an MBA from the Wharton Business School.

Career
Prior to joining Harris Corporation in 2011, he was senior vice president leading strategy and development for United Technologies Corporation. Before this, he was president of UTC's Fire & Security business. During his 14 years at UTC he acquired executive managerial experience in the US and in other countries. Before UTC he worked for McKinsey & Company as a senior engagement manager, overseeing business relationships.

Memberships and boards
Brown is on the board of directors for the Celanese Corporation, the board of the Fire Department of New York City Foundation, the council of trustees for the Association of the United States Army and the board of trustees of the Florida Institute of Technology. He is chairman of the Aerospace Industries Association executive committee and a member of the National Security Telecommunications Advisory Committee. He was a member of the American Manufacturing Council before it was dissolved by President Trump.

References

Living people
American chief executives of manufacturing companies
L3Harris Technologies
Villanova University alumni
Wharton School of the University of Pennsylvania alumni
Year of birth missing (living people)